The ultimatum game is a game that has become a popular instrument of economic experiments. An early description is by Nobel laureate John Harsanyi in 1961.  One player, the proposer, is endowed with a sum of money. The proposer is tasked with splitting it with another player, the responder (who knows what the total sum is). Once the proposer communicates his decision, the responder may accept it or reject it. If the responder accepts, the money is split per the proposal; if the responder rejects, both players receive nothing.  Both players know in advance the consequences of the responder accepting or rejecting the offer.

Equilibrium analysis 
For ease of exposition, the simple example illustrated above can be considered, where the proposer has two options: a fair split, or an unfair split.  The argument given in this section can be extended to the more general case where the proposer can choose from many different splits.

There are two strategies available to the proposer: propose a fair split, or propose an unfair split.  For each of these two splits, the responder can choose to accept or reject, which means that there are four strategies available to the responder: always accept, always reject, accept only a fair split, or accept only an unfair split.

A Nash equilibrium is a pair of strategies (one for the proposer and one for the responder), where neither party can improve their reward by changing strategy. It always benefits the responder to accept the offer, as receiving something is better than receiving nothing. Meanwhile, it benefits the proposer to make an offer that the responder will accept; furthermore, if the responder would accept any offer, then it benefits the proposer to switch from a fair to an unfair offer. So, there are three Nash equilibria for this game:
 The proposer makes a fair offer; the responder would only accept a fair offer.
 The proposer makes an unfair offer; the responder would only accept an unfair offer.
 The proposer makes an unfair offer; the responder would accept any offer.

However, only the last Nash equilibrium satisfies a more restrictive equilibrium concept, subgame perfection. The above game can be viewed as having two subgames: the subgame where the proposer makes a fair offer, and the subgame where the proposer makes an unfair offer. A perfect-subgame equilibrium occurs when there are Nash Equilibria in every subgame, that players have no incentive to deviate from. The theory relies on the assumption that players are rational and utility maximising. In both subgames, it benefits the responder to accept the offer. So, the first two Nash equilibria above are not subgame perfect: the responder can choose a better strategy for one of the subgames.

Multi-valued or continuous strategies

The simplest version of the ultimatum game has two possible strategies for the proposer, Fair and Unfair. A more realistic version would allow for many possible offers. For example, the item being shared might be a dollar bill, worth 100 cents, in which case the proposer's strategy set would be all integers between 0 and 100, inclusive for his choice of offer, S. This would have two subgame perfect equilibria: (Proposer: S=0, Accepter: Accept), which is a weak equilibrium because the acceptor would be indifferent between his two possible strategies;  and the strong (Proposer: S=1, Accepter: Accept if S>=1 and Reject if S=0).

The ultimatum game is also often modelled using a continuous strategy set. Suppose the  proposer chooses a share S of a pie to  offer the receiver, where S can be any real number between 0 and 1, inclusive. If the receiver accepts the offer, the proposer's payoff is (1-S) and the receiver's is S. If the receiver rejects the offer, both players get zero. The unique subgame perfect equilibrium is (S=0, Accept). It is weak because the receiver's payoff is 0 whether he accepts or rejects. No share with S > 0 is subgame perfect, because the proposer would deviate to S' = S -  for some small number  and the receiver's best response would still be to accept. The weak equilibrium is an artifact of the strategy space being continuous.

Experimental results 
The first experimental analysis of the ultimatum game was by Werner Güth, Rolf Schmittberger, and Bernd Schwarze: Their experiments were widely imitated in a variety of settings. When carried out between members of a shared social group (e.g., a village, a tribe, a nation, humanity) people offer "fair" (i.e., 50:50) splits, and offers of less than 30% are often rejected.

One limited study of monozygotic and dizygotic twins claims that genetic variation can have an effect on reactions to unfair offers, though the study failed to employ actual controls for environmental differences. It has also been found that delaying the responder's decision leads to people accepting "unfair" offers more often. Common chimpanzees behaved similarly to humans by proposing fair offers in one version of the ultimatum game involving direct interaction between the chimpanzees.  However, another study also published in November 2012 showed that both kinds of chimpanzees (common chimpanzees and bonobos) did not reject unfair offers, using a mechanical apparatus.

Cross-cultural differences 

Some studies have found significant differences between cultures in the offers most likely to be accepted and most likely to maximize the proposer's income.  In one study of 15 small-scale societies, proposers in gift-giving cultures were more likely to make high offers and responders were more likely to reject high offers despite anonymity, while low offers were expected and accepted in other societies, which the authors suggested were related to the ways that giving and receiving were connected to social status in each group.  Proposers and responders from WEIRD (Western, educated, industrialized, rich, democratic) societies are most likely to settle on equal splits.

Framing effects 

Some studies have found significant effects of framing on game outcomes.  Outcomes have been found to change based on characterizing the proposer's role as giving versus splitting versus taking, or characterizing the game as a windfall game versus a routine transaction game.

Explanations 
The highly mixed results, along with similar results in the dictator game, have been taken as both evidence for and against the Homo economicus assumptions of rational, utility-maximizing, individual decisions. Since an individual who rejects a positive offer is choosing to get nothing rather than something, that individual must not be acting solely to maximize their economic gain, unless one incorporates economic applications of social, psychological, and methodological factors (such as the observer effect). Several attempts have been made to explain this behavior. Some suggest that individuals are maximizing their expected utility, but money does not translate directly into expected utility. Perhaps individuals get some psychological benefit from engaging in punishment or receive some psychological harm from accepting a low offer. It could also be the case that the second player, by having the power to reject the offer, uses such power as leverage against the first player, thus motivating them to be fair.

The classical explanation of the ultimatum game as a well-formed experiment approximating general behaviour often leads to a conclusion that the rational behavior in assumption is accurate to a degree, but must encompass additional vectors of decision making. Behavioral economic and psychological accounts suggest that second players who reject offers less than 50% of the amount at stake do so for one of two reasons. An altruistic punishment account suggests that rejections occur out of altruism: people reject unfair offers to teach the first player a lesson and thereby reduce the likelihood that the player will make an unfair offer in the future. Thus, rejections are made to benefit the second player in the future, or other people in the future. By contrast, a self-control account suggests that rejections constitute a failure to inhibit a desire to punish the first player for making an unfair offer. Morewedge, Krishnamurti, and Ariely (2014) found that intoxicated participants were more likely to reject unfair offers than sober participants. As intoxication tends to exacerbate decision makers' prepotent response, this result provides support for the self-control account, rather than the altruistic punishment account. Other research from social cognitive neuroscience supports this finding.

However, several competing models suggest ways to bring the cultural preferences of the players within the optimized utility function of the players in such a way as to preserve the utility maximizing agent as a feature of microeconomics. For example, researchers have found that Mongolian proposers tend to offer even splits despite knowing that very unequal splits are almost always accepted. Similar results from other small-scale societies players have led some researchers to conclude that "reputation" is seen as more important than any economic reward. Others have proposed the social status of the responder may be part of the payoff. Another way of integrating the conclusion with utility maximization is some form of inequity aversion model (preference for fairness). Even in anonymous one-shot settings, the economic-theory suggested outcome of minimum money transfer and acceptance is rejected by over 80% of the players.

An explanation which was originally quite popular was the "learning" model, in which it was hypothesized that proposers’ offers would decay towards the sub game perfect Nash equilibrium (almost zero) as they mastered the strategy of the game; this decay tends to be seen in other iterated games. However, this explanation (bounded rationality) is less commonly offered now, in light of subsequent empirical evidence.

It has been hypothesized (e.g. by James Surowiecki) that very unequal allocations are rejected only because the absolute amount of the offer is low. The concept here is that if the amount to be split were 10 million dollars, a 9:1 split would probably be accepted rather than rejecting a 1 million-dollar offer. Essentially, this explanation says that the absolute amount of the endowment is not significant enough to produce strategically optimal behaviour. However, many experiments have been performed where the amount offered was substantial: studies by Cameron and Hoffman et al. have found that higher stakes cause offers to approach closer to an even split, even in a US$100 game played in Indonesia, where average per-capita income is much lower than in the United States. Rejections are reportedly independent of the stakes at this level, with US$30 offers being turned down in Indonesia, as in the United States, even though this equates to two weeks' wages in Indonesia. However, 2011 research with stakes of up to 40 weeks' wages in India showed that "as stakes increase, rejection rates approach zero".

Neurological explanations 
Generous offers in the ultimatum game (offers exceeding the minimum acceptable offer) are commonly made.  Zak, Stanton & Ahmadi (2007) showed that two factors can explain generous offers: empathy and perspective taking.  They varied empathy by infusing participants with intranasal oxytocin or placebo (blinded). They affected perspective-taking by asking participants to make choices as both player 1 and player 2 in the ultimatum game, with later random assignment to one of these.  Oxytocin increased generous offers by 80% relative to placebo. Oxytocin did not affect the minimum acceptance threshold or offers in the dictator game (meant to measure altruism).  This indicates that emotions drive generosity.

Rejections in the ultimatum game have been shown to be caused by adverse physiologic reactions to stingy offers.  In a brain imaging experiment by Sanfey et al., stingy offers (relative to fair and hyperfair offers) differentially activated several brain areas, especially the anterior insular cortex, a region associated with visceral disgust. If Player 1 in the ultimatum game anticipates this response to a stingy offer, they may be more generous.

An increase in rational decisions in the game has been found among experienced Buddhist meditators.  fMRI data show that meditators recruit the posterior insular cortex (associated with interoception) during unfair offers and show reduced activity in the anterior insular cortex compared to controls.

People whose serotonin levels have been artificially lowered will reject unfair offers more often than players with normal serotonin levels.

People who have ventromedial frontal cortex lesions were found to be more likely to reject unfair offers. This was suggested to be due to the abstractness and delay of the reward, rather than an increased emotional response to the unfairness of the offer.

Evolutionary game theory
Other authors have used evolutionary game theory to explain behavior in the ultimatum game. Simple evolutionary models, e.g. the replicator dynamics, cannot account for the evolution of fair proposals or for rejections. These authors have attempted to provide increasingly complex models to explain fair behavior.

Sociological applications 
The ultimatum game is important from a sociological perspective, because it illustrates the human unwillingness to accept injustice. The tendency to refuse small offers may also be seen as relevant to the concept of honour.

The extent to which people are willing to tolerate different distributions of the reward from "cooperative" ventures results in inequality that is, measurably, exponential across the strata of management within large corporations. See also: Inequity aversion within companies.

History 
An early description of the ultimatum game is by Nobel laureate John Harsanyi in 1961, who  footnotes Thomas Schelling's 1960 book, The Strategy of Conflict on its solution by dominance methods. Harsanyi says,

 "An important application of this principle is to ultimatum games, i.e., to bargaining games where one of the players can firmly commit himself in advance under a heavy penalty that he will insist under all conditions upon a certain specified demand (which is called his ultimatum).... Consequently, it will be rational for the first player to commit himself to his maximum demand,  i.e., to the most extreme admissible demand he can make."

Josh Clark attributes modern interest in the game to  Ariel Rubinstein, but the best-known article is the 1982 experimental analysis of Güth, Schmittberger, and Schwarze. Results from testing the ultimatum game challenged the traditional economic principle that consumers are rational and utility-maximising. This started a variety of research into the psychology of humans. Since the ultimatum game's development, it has become a popular economic experiment, and was said to be "quickly catching up with the Prisoner's Dilemma as a prime showpiece of apparently irrational behavior" in a paper by Martin Nowak, Karen M. Page, and Karl Sigmund.

Variants 
In the "competitive ultimatum game" there are many proposers and the responder can accept at most one of their offers: With more than three (naïve) proposers the responder is usually offered almost the entire endowment (which would be the Nash Equilibrium assuming no collusion among proposers).

In the "ultimatum game with tipping", a tip is allowed from responder back to proposer, a feature of the trust game, and net splits tend to be more equitable.

The "reverse ultimatum game" gives more power to the responder by giving the proposer the right to offer as many divisions of the endowment as they like. Now the game only ends when the responder accepts an offer or abandons the game, and therefore the proposer tends to receive slightly less than half of the initial endowment.

Incomplete information ultimatum games: Some authors have studied variants of the ultimatum game in which either the proposer or the responder has private information about the size of the pie to be divided. These experiments connect the ultimatum game to principal-agent problems studied in contract theory.

The pirate game illustrates a variant with more than two participants with voting power, as illustrated in Ian Stewart's "A Puzzle for Pirates".

See also 

Dictator game
Fair division experiments
Gift-exchange game
Impunity game
Neuroeconomics
Public goods game
Prisoner's dilemma
Social preferences

References

Further reading 
 
 
 
 
 Bicchieri, Cristina and Jiji Zhang (2008). "An Embarrassment of Riches: Modeling Social Preferences in Ultimatum games", in U. Maki (ed) Handbook of the Philosophy of Economics, Elsevier

External links 
 Video lecture on the ultimatum game

Non-cooperative games
Moral psychology
Social science experiments